Bayadha District is a district of El Oued Province, Algeria. As of the 2008 census, it has a population of 32,926.

Communes

Bayadha District consists of one commune:
Bayadha

References

Districts of El Oued Province